Lasiobolus lasioboloides is a species of coprophilous fungus in the family Ascodesmidaceae. It grows on the dung of sheep.

References

External links

Fungi described in 1885
Fungi of Europe
Fungi of Greece
Pezizales